In mathematics, the Hilbert–Smith conjecture is concerned with the transformation groups of manifolds; and in particular with the limitations on topological groups G that can act effectively (faithfully) on a (topological) manifold M. Restricting to G which are locally compact and have a continuous, faithful group action on M, it states that G must be a Lie group.

Because of known structural results on G, it is enough to deal with the case where G is the additive group Zp of p-adic integers, for some prime number p. An equivalent form of the conjecture is that Zp has no faithful group action on a topological manifold.

The naming of the conjecture is for David Hilbert, and the American topologist Paul A. Smith. It is considered by some to be a better formulation of Hilbert's fifth problem, than the characterisation in the category of topological groups of the Lie groups often cited as a solution.

In 1997, Dušan Repovš and Evgenij Ščepin proved the Hilbert–Smith conjecture for groups acting by Lipschitz maps on a Riemannian manifold using the covering, fractal and cohomological dimension theory.

In 1999, Gaven Martin extended their dimension-theoretic argument to quasiconformal actions on a Riemannian manifold and gave applications concerning unique analytic continuation for Beltrami systems.

In 2013, John Pardon proved the three-dimensional case of the Hilbert–Smith conjecture.

References

Further reading
.

Topological groups
Group actions (mathematics)
Conjectures
Unsolved problems in geometry
Structures on manifolds